Durovo is the name of several rural localities in Russia:
Durovo, Vereshchaginsky District, Perm Krai, a village in Vereshchaginsky District, Perm Krai
Durovo, Kochyovsky  District, Perm Krai, a village in Kochyovsky District, Perm Krai